Mystery Date is a board game from the Milton Bradley Company released in 1965, conceived by Marvin Glass and created by Henry Stan.  Marketed to girls 6 to 14 years of age, it has been reissued in 1970, 1999, and 2005. It is popularly referenced as a trope in TV and film.

Gameplay

Mystery Date can be played with 2, 3, or 4 players. The object of the game is to acquire a desirable date, while avoiding the "dud". The player must assemble an outfit by acquiring three matching color-coded cards, which then must match the outfit of the date at the "mystery door". The date is revealed by spinning the door handle and opening the plastic door on the game board. The five possible dates are the "formal dance" date, the "bowling" date, the "beach" date, the "skiing" date, and the "dud".

The date to be avoided is the poorly dressed "dud". He is wearing slovenly attire, his hair is tousled, and his face sports a beard shadow. In the 1970s game, a "picnic" date replaces the "bowling" date.

If the player's outfit does not match the date behind the door, the door is closed and play continues.

The 1999 version of the game includes an "electronic talking phone" to converse with the dates. Future Captain America actor Chris Evans is on the box using the phone as "Tyler", the "beach" date.

Reception
The book Timeless Toys described Mystery Date as if it were the result of crossing "Barbie in all her high-fashion glory with 1965's biggest game show, Let's Make a Deal". Calling it an example of "simple, yet ingenious" quality typically associated with Marvin Glass, it is now considered "one of the most sought-after games from the '60s".

Having played it as a child, Michelle Slatalla of The New York Times in the 2000s retrospectively called the game's premise "politically incorrect".

References

External links
Mystery Date 1965 television commercial

Mystery Date at gamepart.Com

Board games introduced in 1965
Milton Bradley Company games
Children's board games
Multiplayer games